The 1868 United States presidential election in Iowa took place on November 3, 1868, as part of the 1868 United States presidential election. Voters chose eight representatives, or electors to the Electoral College, who voted for president and vice president.

Iowa voted for the Republican nominee, Ulysses S. Grant, over the Democratic nominee, Horatio Seymour. Grant won the state by a margin of 23.84%.

Results

See also
 United States presidential elections in Iowa

References

Iowa
1868
1868 Iowa elections